William Taylor CBE QPM (born 25 March 1947) is a retired British police officer.

Taylor was educated at Blairgowrie High School, Perthshire, Scotland. In 1966 he joined the Metropolitan Police in London as a Constable. He later joined the Criminal Investigation Department (CID) as a Detective Constable and served at police stations in Central London until 1976, when, as a Detective Chief Inspector, he was transferred to the Community Relations Branch at Scotland Yard. 

In 1978, he was promoted to Detective Superintendent and assigned to the Central Drugs Squad. In 1980 he was promoted to Detective Chief Superintendent and became staff officer to Commissioner Sir David McNee. 

In 1982, he was promoted to Commander, the youngest officer of chief officer rank in the Metropolitan Police, and was appointed Commander CID (North East London). The following year he was appointed Commander Hackney and Stoke Newington (back in uniform), and in January 1985 he became Commander Flying Squad, in which role he also headed No. 9 Regional Crime Squad.

However, a few months later, in July 1985, Taylor was appointed Assistant Commissioner (deputy head) of the City of London Police and in 1989 Deputy Chief Constable of Thames Valley Police. 

In 1990, he returned to the Metropolitan Police as Assistant Commissioner Specialist Operations (ACSO). In 1994 he was appointed Commissioner of Police of the City of London. In 1996 he was one of three contenders for the post of Chief Constable of the Royal Ulster Constabulary, but lost out to Ronnie Flanagan. 

In 1998, he was appointed one of HM Inspectors of Constabulary and the following year was appointed HM Chief Inspector of Constabulary for Scotland, a post he held until his retirement in 2001. In 2003 he headed the Metropolitan Police inquiry into the collapse of the theft case against former royal butlers Paul Burrell and Harold Brown in 2002.

Taylor was awarded the Queen's Police Medal (QPM) in 1991 and was appointed Commander of the Order of the British Empire (CBE) in the 2001 Birthday Honours for services to the police.

Footnotes

References
Biography, Who's Who

1947 births
Living people
People from Blairgowrie and Rattray
People educated at Blairgowrie High School
Scottish police officers
Assistant Commissioners of Police of the Metropolis
Commissioners of the City of London Police
British police chief officers
Commanders of the Order of the British Empire
Scottish recipients of the Queen's Police Medal
Metropolitan Police recipients of the Queen's Police Medal
Chief Inspectors of Constabulary (Scotland)